Events from the 1610s in Canada.

Events
 1610-11: The English explorer Henry Hudson, in Dutch service, continues the fruitless search for a passage to Asia.
 1610: Henry Hudson, in service of the Netherlands, explores the river named for him. Hudson explores Hudson Bay in spite of a mutinous crew. Manhattan Indians attack his ship. Mahican people make peaceful contact, and a lucrative fur trade begins.
 1610: Etienne Brule lives among Huron and is first European to see Lakes Ontario, Huron, and Superior.
 1611: Champlain builds fur post at Montreal.
 1612: Champlain is named Governor of New France.
 1613: Port Royal sacked by Samuel Argall and his pirates from Virginia.
 1613: St. John's, Newfoundland is founded.
 1614: Franciscan Recollet friars arrive to convert the Indians.
 1615: French Roman Catholic missionaries arrive in Canada.
 1615: Champlain attacks Onondaga villages with the help of a Huron war party, this turning the Iroquois League against the French.
 1616-20: Smallpox epidemic strikes New England tribes between Narragansett Bay and the Penobscot River.
 1617: Louis Hebert, an apothecary who had stayed at Port Royal twice, brings his wife and children to Quebec, thus becoming the first true habitant (permanent settler supporting his family from the soil).

Births
Marie Guenet de Saint-Ignace (1610-1646), French-Canadian abbess and hospital manager

See also

List of French forts in North America
Former colonies and territories in Canada
List of North American settlements by year of foundation
Timeline of the European colonization of North America
History of Canada
Timeline of Canada history
List of years in Canada

References

Further reading